Toli may refer to:

China
Toli County, China

Nepal
Toli, Bheri
Toli, Seti

Other
Toli, a company-sized unit in the Afghan National Army
Toli (shamanism), a ritual mirror used in Shamanism in Mongolia and the Republic of Buryatia